A multimedia franchise (or a transmedia franchise) is a media franchise for which installments exist in multiple forms of media, such as books, comics, films, television series, animated series and video games. Multimedia franchises usually develop due to the popularization of an original creative work, and then its expansion to other media through licensing agreements, with respect to intellectual property in the franchise's characters and settings, although the trend later developed wherein franchises would be launched in multiple forms of media simultaneously.

In order to qualify for these lists, a franchise must have works in at least three forms of media, and must have two or more separate works in at least two of those forms of media (a television series or comic book series is considered a single work for purposes of this list; multiple spin-off series or reboots of a previously ended series are considered multiple works). For example, a television series that spawned one film and one novelization would not qualify; a television series that had a spin-off series, or was remade as a new series, and which spawned two films and one novelization does qualify. These lists do not include public domain works from which adaptations have been made in multiple media only after the works entered the public domain, which do not involve licensing or other means by which an author or owner controls the franchise. A franchise may be included if it obtained multimedia franchise status prior to works within the collection entering the public domain.

Following are lists of multimedia franchises, divided by media characteristics:

Multimedia franchises originating in print

Franchises originating in literary works

A Song of Ice and Fire
Arthur
American Psycho
Babar
Berenstain Bears
Blade Runner
Buck Rogers
Captain Underpants
The Cat in the Hat
The Chronicles of Narnia
Conan the Barbarian
Curious George
Die Hard
Discworld
Dune
Ender's Game
Gidget
Greyfriars School
The Godfather
Hannibal Lecter
Harry Potter
Hercule Poirot
His Dark Materials
How to Train Your Dragon
James Bond
Jason Bourne
Jennings
Jumanji
Jurassic Park
Left Behind
Legend of the Galactic Heroes
Mary Poppins
Megami Tensei
Miss Marple
Monogatari
Moomins
One Hundred and One Dalmatians
Paddington Bear
Parasite Eve
Perry Mason
Peter Rabbit
Planet of the Apes
Professor Branestawm
Psycho
Rambo
Robert Langdon
Rudolph the Red-Nosed Reindeer
Sex and the City
Shrek
Starship Troopers
Sword Art Online
Middle-earth
Thomas & Friends
Tom Clancy media
The Witcher

Franchises originating in comics strips, comic books, and other printed cartoons

300
The Addams Family
Alien vs. Predator
Archie Comics
Ashita no Joe
Asterix
Attack on Titan
Bleach
DC Universe
Death Note
Detective Conan
Diary of a Wimpy Kid
Doraemon
Dragon Ball
Dyesebel
Fullmetal Alchemist
Garfield
Ghost in the Shell
Hellboy
Initial D
Josie and the Pussycats
Judge Dredd
Lucky Luke
Lupin the Third
Marsupilami
The Mask
Marvel Universe
Men in Black
Miffy
My Hero Academia
Naruto/Boruto
One Piece
Peanuts
Popeye
Ranma ½
Sabrina the Teenage Witch
Sailor Moon
Saint Seiya
Sgt. Frog
The Smurfs
Spawn
Spirou & Fantasio
Teenage Mutant Ninja Turtles
Tintin
Turok
The Walking Dead
Wangan Midnight
Yu-Gi-Oh!
YuYu Hakusho

Multimedia franchises originating in television series

Franchises originating in animated television series

The Amazing World of Gumball
Avatar: The Last Airbender
Beavis and Butt-Head
Ben 10
Blue's Clues
Bob the Builder
Dora the Explorer
The Fairly OddParents
The Flintstones
Gundam
The Loud House
Neon Genesis Evangelion
Rick and Morty
RWBY
Scooby-Doo
The Simpsons
Space Battleship Yamato
Space Ghost
SpongeBob SquarePants
Steven Universe
VeggieTales
Voltron
Winx Club
Yogi's Gang

Franchises originating in live action television series

Ali G
The Avengers
Babylon 5
Barney & Friends
Battlestar Galactica
The Bill
Blake's 7
The Brady Bunch
Charlie's Angels
Dad's Army
Doctor Who
The Equalizer
Fraggle Rock
Jackass
Last of the Summer Wine
Mission: Impossible
Monty Python
Mr. Bean
The Muppets
Only Fools and Horses
Power Rangers/Super Sentai
The Prisoner
Red Dwarf
Sesame Street
Star Trek
The Sweeney
The Twilight Zone
The X-Files

Multimedia franchises originating in films

Franchises originating in animated films

An American Tail
Cars
Casper the Friendly Ghost
Despicable Me
Felix the Cat
Finding Nemo
Frozen
Hotel Transylvania
Ice Age
The Incredibles
Kung Fu Panda
The Land Before Time
Lilo & Stitch
The Lion King
Sing
Looney Tunes
Madagascar
Mickey Mouse and Friends
Monsters, Inc.
The Secret Life of Pets
Tangled
Tom and Jerry
Toy Story
Wallace and Gromit
Woody Woodpecker

Franchises originating in live-action films

Alien
Back to the Future
Bill & Ted
Buffyverse
The Chronicles of Riddick
Evil Dead
Final Destination
Ghostbusters
Godzilla
Gremlins
Halloween
Herbie
Highlander
Indiana Jones
The Karate Kid
King Kong
The Matrix
The Pink Panther
Police Academy
Predator
RoboCop
Rocky
Saw
Stargate
Star Wars
Terminator
Tron

Multimedia franchises originating in games, toys, and merchandise

Franchises originating in video games including film and/or television works

Ace Attorney
Alone in the Dark
Animal Crossing
Angry Birds
Assassin's Creed
Bayonetta
Bomberman
Borderlands
Call of Duty
Castlevania
Chrono
Crash Bandicoot
Dante's Inferno
Darkstalkers
Dead Rising
Dead Space
Devil May Cry
Doom
Dota
Dragon Age
Dragon Quest
Far Cry
Fatal Frame
Final Fantasy
Fire Emblem
Grand Theft Auto
Half-Life
Halo
Hitman
Kemono Friends
Kingdom Hearts 
The King of Fighters
Kirby
League of Legends
The Legend of Zelda
Mario
Mass Effect
Max Payne
Mega Man
Monster Hunter
Mortal Kombat
Pac-Man
Persona
Pokémon
Prince of Persia
Ratchet & Clank
Rayman
Red Dead
Resident Evil
Silent Hill
Sonic the Hedgehog
Star Ocean
Street Fighter
Tekken
The Last of Us
Tomb Raider
Trails
Uncharted
Xeno
Warcraft
Wing Commander
Zone of the Enders

Franchises originating in video games not including film and/or television works

Alan Wake
Banjo-Kazooie
Battlefield
Bioshock
Contra
Crysis
Darksiders
Dead Island
Destiny
Deus Ex
Diablo
Dishonored
Drakengard
Duke Nukem
The Elder Scrolls
The Evil Within
Fable
Fallout
Five Nights at Freddy's
Gears of War
God of War
Guild Wars
Infamous
Just Cause
Killzone
Left 4 Dead
Legacy of Kain
Life Is Strange
Metal Gear
Metroid
Onimusha
Portal
Quake
Soulcalibur
Splatoon
StarCraft
Suikoden
Star Fox
Thief
Watch Dogs
Wolfenstein

Franchises originating in board games, card games, tabletop games and role-playing games

BattleTech
Car Wars
Cyberpunk
Dungeons & Dragons
Magic: The Gathering
Mutant Chronicles
Shadowrun
Warhammer
World of Darkness

Franchises originating in toys, attractions and other media

Alvin and the Chipmunks
The Amory Wars
American Girl
Barbie
BanG Dream!
Bratz
Captain Sabertooth
Care Bears
Digimon
G.I. Joe
The Hitchhiker's Guide to the Galaxy
Lego
Lone Ranger
Madea
My Little Pony
The Odd Couple
Patlabor
Pirates of the Caribbean
Strawberry Shortcake
Transformers

See also
 List of fictional shared universes in film and television – many multimedia franchises are based in fictional universes
 List of public domain works with multimedia adaptations
 List of highest-grossing media franchises
 Media franchise

References